Cyrtodactylus jeyporensis, also known as the Jeypore Indian gecko, the Jeypore ground gecko, or the Patinghe Indian gecko, is an endangered species of gecko found in India, which was until recently considered extinct. Described from a single specimen in 1877, it was rediscovered in 2010 in the Eastern Ghats of Odisha state, India.

Discovery and rediscovery
The holotype is deposited as BNHM 82.5.22.37 in the Natural History Museum (earlier British Museum of natural history).

In 2009, Ishan Aggarwal, a doctoral student at the Centre for Ecological Sciences, Indian Institute of Sciences, Bangalore, started working on the genus Geckoella. He hoped to rediscover this "lost" species as it would help piece together the evolutionary history of the genus. The search began with piecing together the route of Beddome's explorations in the Eastern Ghats. After many months of research, the CES and the Bombay Natural History Society (BNHS) put together expeditions in high elevation areas of the Eastern Ghats in southern Odisha in September 2010 and northern Andhra Pradesh in November  2011. 
 
A sub-adult male lizard was collected on 20 September 2010 in Koraput district, Odisha, by Ishan Agarwal and Aniruddha Datta-Roy of CES which was deposited in the collection of the BNHS. A second specimen, an adult male, was recorded on 9 October 2011 from Galikonda, Visakhapatnam district, Andhra Pradesh extending its known distribution range.

Description
Description of type, male specimen, collected in Jeypore by Beddome in 1877:

Measurements :
 Total length : 
 Head : 
 Width of body : 
 Body : 
 Forelimb : 
 Hindlimb : 
 Tail :

Distribution
The lizard appears to inhabit semi-evergreen forests in high elevation areas (> ) of the Eastern Ghats of southern Odisha and northern Andhra Pradesh. However, the areas where the lizard has been found are under tremendous pressure from deforestation and mining. The taxon is surmised to possibly be a wet-zone relict stranded by the aridification of peninsular India.

References

External links

Cyrtodactylus
Endemic fauna of India
Reptiles of India
Lizards of Asia
Reptiles described in 1877
Critically endangered fauna of Asia
Taxa named by Richard Henry Beddome